is a Japanese footballer who plays for ReinMeer Aomori on loan from Oita Trinita.

Career
Koyo Sato joined J2 League club Oita Trinita in 2015. In March, he moved to Japan Football League club Verspah Oita. In June, he backed to Oita Trinita. On September 22, 2016, he professional debuted in Emperor's Cup (v Shimizu S-Pulse).

Club statistics
Updated to 23 February 2018.

References

External links

Profile at Oita Trinita

1996 births
Living people
Association football people from Ōita Prefecture
Japanese footballers
J2 League players
J3 League players
Japan Football League players
Oita Trinita players
Verspah Oita players
ReinMeer Aomori players
Association football defenders